Redon Mihana (born 28 June 1999) is an Albanian professional footballer who plays as a midfielder for Albanian club Dinamo Tirana.

Club career

Early career
Mihana started his youth career at KF Laçi in 2014 and spent one season there before moving at Apolonia. In the 2016–17 season he played 10 games and scored 4 goals with the under-19 side.

Apolonia
 lacjan përjet

International career
Mihana debuted at international level with Albania under-19 team under coach Erjon Bogdani on 30 August 2017 against Georgia U19 playing as a starter in a 1–0 victory at Loni Papuçiu Stadium in Fier.

Career statistics

Club

References

1999 births
Living people
Footballers from Tirana
Albanian footballers
Association football midfielders
Albania youth international footballers
KF Apolonia Fier players
Kategoria e Parë players